Danijela Veljović is a politician in Serbia. She served in the Kragujevac municipal assembly from 2012 to 2020 and was elected to the National Assembly of Serbia in the 2020 parliamentary election. Veljović is a member of the Social Democratic Party of Serbia.

Private career
Veljović has a master of laws degree and is based in Kragujevac.

Politician

Municipal politics
Veljović was first elected to the Kragujevac municipal assembly in the 2012 Serbian local elections. The SDPS contested this election in an alliance with the Democratic Party; Veljović received the twelfth position on the latter's Choice for a Better Life electoral list and was elected when the list won exactly twelve mandates out of eighty-seven, finishing in third place. The SDPS subsequently aligned itself with the Serbian Progressive Party at both the republic and the local level. Veljović received the twenty-fourth position on the Progressive list in the 2016 local elections and was elected for a second term when the list won forty mandates.

She received the seventy-eighth position on the Progressive list in the 2020 local elections. This was too low a position for re-election to be a realistic prospect, and indeed she was not re-elected when the list won a majority victory with forty-six mandates. Her low position on the list was presumably due to her candidacy for the national assembly.

Parliamentarian
Veljović received the 243rd position out of 250 on the Progressive Party's Aleksandar Vučić – Serbia Is Winning electoral list in the 2016 Serbian parliamentary election. The list won a majority victory with 131 seats and she was not elected. She was promoted to the seventieth position on the successor Aleksandar Vučić — For Our Children list in the 2020 election and was elected when the list won a landslide majority with 188 mandates. She is now the deputy chair of the committee on Kosovo-Metohija; a member of the committee on the rights of the child; a deputy member of the committee on the judiciary, public administration, and local self-government; the leader of Serbia's parliamentary friendship group with Guatemala; and a member of the parliamentary friendship groups with Argentina, Austria, Ecuador, Mauritius, Morocco, Paraguay, Slovenia, the United Arab Emirates, and the United States of America.

References

1977 births
Living people
Politicians from Kragujevac
Members of the National Assembly (Serbia)
Social Democratic Party of Serbia politicians
Women members of the National Assembly (Serbia)